The Samsung SGH-D500 is a slider-style mobile phone created by Samsung. It was announced in Q4 2004 as a replacement to the popular Samsung E800. It has a 1.3 megapixel digital camera with an integrated LED flash. The phone can be purchased in various colors such as black, grey/silver, silver/white, silver/blue, black/blue, and black/silver. The D500 won the prestigious award "the world's best cellphone" at the 3GSM world congress in Cannes, 2005. The SGH-D500 was popular with consumers because of the large screen-size to front-surface ratio, the smooth button and sliding action, powerful flash, and good video/photograph/sound quality. The D500 was regarded as compact and as having a good feature set for its time. Samsung experienced remarkable success with the introduction of the D500 and has therefore introduced several other slider-style mobile phones in recent years, some fairly successful, others not so much. This phone helped to popularise the 'active' sliding phone concept across all brands. The SGH-D500 has been succeeded by the Samsung SGH-D600. There is a very similar variant handset, the SGH-D500E.

Due to wireless networks supplying the D500 to customers with branded software, this phone is very often 'flashed' by owners. This removes/changes onscreen branding, the unpopular shortcut sidebar and non-optional sounds (e.g. branding sound on power-on/off). The new software can add features such as voice-dial and voice-command, and increased memory availability.

The SGH-D500 received some criticism for not having expandable memory (via a memory slot). There are known issues with the screen of this phone. The screen connector can disconnect, resulting in no display ('white screen problem'). The screen is also vulnerable to being damaged through careless use or accidental impact.

The phone was popular and sold 12 million units worldwide, also making it Samsung's first phone to sell over a million.

References

D500
Mobile phones introduced in 2004
Slider phones